Swapna may refer to:

 Swapna (philosophy) the dreaming aspect of the Hindu philosophy of consciousness.
 Swapna (1942 film), a 1942 Bollywood film
 Swapna (1981 film), a 1981 Telugu film
 Swapna, the title of the Sinhala dubbed version of Diya Aur Baati Hum

People 

 Swapna (actress), South Indian film actress
 Swapna Sundari (dancer), Indian dancer, an exponent of Kuchipudi and Bharata Natyam
 Swapna Waghmare Joshi (born 1966), Indian TV director and producer
 Swapna (journalist), Telugu-language TV presenter and journalist